Roger Excoffon (7 September 1910 – 30 May 1983) was a French typeface designer and graphic designer.

Excoffon was born in Marseille, studied law at the University of Aix-en-Provence, and then moved to Paris to apprentice in a print shop. In 1947, he formed his own advertising agency and concurrently became design director of a small foundry in Marseille called Fonderie Olive. Later, he co-founded the prestigious Studio U+O, named in reference to "Urbi et Orbi".

Excoffon's best-known faces are Mistral and Antique Olive, the latter which he designed between 1962 and 1966. Air France, one of Excoffon's largest and most prestigious clients, used a customized variant of Antique Olive in its wordmark and livery until 2009, when a new logo was introduced.

Excoffon's faces, even the sober Antique Olive, have an organic vibrancy not found in similar sans-serif types of the period. His typefaces gave voice to an exuberant body of contemporary French and European graphic design.

He is a founding member of L’Académie nationale des arts de la rue (ANAR) created in 1975 with Jacques Dauphin, Maurice Cazeneuve, Paul Delouvrier, Georges Elgozy, Abraham Moles, and André Parinaud.

Typefaces
These typefaces were designed by Roger Excoffon:

References
Rault, David. Roger Excoffon, le gentleman de la typographie, bilingual French-English publication, Perrousseaux Editeur, Meolans Revel, 2011, .
Fiedl, Frederich, Nicholas Ott and Bernard Stein. Typography: An Encyclopedic Survey of Type Design and Techniques Through History. Black Dog & Leventhal: 1998. .
Macmillan, Neil. An A–Z of Type Designers. Yale University Press: 2006. .
Sandra Chamaret & Julien Gineste & Sébastien Morlighem. Roger Excoffon et la fonderie Olive, bilingual French-English publication, Ypsilon Editeur, Paris, 2010, 328 p., .

External links

MyFonts
Speed and Grace of Excoffon's types
Postage stamps by Roger Excoffon
Roger Excoffon's archives website

1910 births
French typographers and type designers
1983 deaths
20th-century French inventors
Businesspeople from Marseille